Alan Bannister  MBE (3 November 1922 – 18 May 2007) was an English cyclist.

Cycling career
He was born in Manchester and won a silver medal, representing Great Britain, in the tandem event at the 1948 Summer Olympics in London, together with Reg Harris. He also competed in the same event at the 1952 Summer Olympics.  

Bannister was a three times British track champion, winning the British National Individual Sprint Championships in 1948, 1949 and 1950.

Personal life
He was awarded an MBE. He had two sons Mark and Paul.

References

External links
 

1922 births
2007 deaths
Sportspeople from Manchester
English male cyclists
English Olympic medallists
Cyclists at the 1948 Summer Olympics
Cyclists at the 1952 Summer Olympics
Members of the Order of the British Empire
Olympic cyclists of Great Britain
Olympic silver medallists for Great Britain
Olympic medalists in cycling
Medalists at the 1948 Summer Olympics